Vien may refer to:
 Vien (name)
 Vien (Hasidic community)
 Vien (Rabbinical dynasty)

See also 
 Viens (disambiguation)
 Vein (disambiguation)